Apamea amputatrix, the yellow-headed cutworm, is a moth of the family Noctuidae. It is found in most of North America, north to the Arctic.

Description

This wingspan is about 40 mm. The moth flies from April to October depending on the location.

The larvae feed on a wide range of host plants, including vegetable crops.

External links
Photo Gallery. Mississippi Entomological Museum, Mississippi State University.
A. amputatrix. Bug Guide.

Apamea (moth)
Moths of North America
Taxa named by Asa Fitch
Moths described in 1857